"Elle, tu l'aimes..." is a 1999 song recorded by French artist Hélène Ségara, released on April 18, 2000. It was the second single from her second studio album, Au Nom d'une Femme, on which it features as the fourth track. Although it failed to reach number one on the charts, it was a hit like Ségara's previous single, "Il y a trop de gens qui t'aiment".

Song information
The music was composed by Frederico de Brito and Ferrer Trinidade. The French lyrics were written by Michel Jourdan. It is based on the Portuguese fado, "Solidão (Canção do Mar)" by Amália Rodrigues (and later Dulce Pontes) covered in a Mediterranean style with a melodic tune played on piano. The percussion use the cadence of a languorous belly dance. As for the previous single, "Elle, tu l'aimes..." deals with a love that is not shared. In the music video, the singer loves a man who is marrying another woman but in reality he loves the other one.

Performed during Ségara's first tour, the song is also available in a live version on her album En concert à l'Olympia. The song was also included on the singer compilation Le Best of. It also features on many French compilations, such as Les Plus Grandes Chansons du siècle, vol. 2 and Les Plus Belles Victoires de la Musique, released in 2002.

Chart performances
In France, the single entered the chart at number 21 on 22 April 2000, although the previous hit "Il y a trop de gens qui t'aiment" was still well placed, in its 24th week. It reached the top ten two weeks later and hit number three in its seventh week. It remained for 14 weeks in the top ten, then dropped slowly, totalling 26 weeks in the top 50 and 31 weeks on the chart. It finally achieved Platinum status and appeared at number 11 on the End of the Year Chart.

In Belgium (Wallonia), the single debuted at number 24 on 29 April, then jumped to number ten and peaked at number four in the ninth week. It fell off the chart (top 40) after 20 weeks, 12 of them in the top ten. It was ranked at number 14 on the Annual Chart.

Track listings
 CD single

 Digital download

Personnel
 Lyrics and music: F.Brito, F.Trinidade
 Adaptation: Michel Jourdan
 Programmation and keyboards: Sandro Abaldonato
 Guitar: Serge Eymar
 Mixing: Thierry Rogen, at Studio Mega
 Assistant: Xavier Poisonnier
 Editions: Warner Chappell Music

Charts and sales

Peak positions

Year-end charts

Certifications

References

External links
 "Elle, tu l'aimes...", lyrics + music video, filmed in Óbidos, Portugal

1999 songs
2000 singles
Hélène Ségara songs
East West Records singles